Esfandiari (Esfandiyārī, meaning related to Esfandiyār) refer to the following:

Esfandiari, Iran
Ali Esfandiari, known as Nima Yooshij
Antonio Esfandiari
Haleh Esfandiari
Soraya Esfandiari
Esmaeil Esfandiari

See also
Esfandiyār (disambiguation)